Tembien is a historic region in Ethiopia's Tigray Region and a former province of Ethiopia

Tembien may also refer to:

 Italian submarine Tembien, sunk in World War II
 SS Tembien Italian merchant ship sunk in World War II
 Tembien, nickname of a subunit of the Italian 3rd CCNN Division "Penne Nere", which fought in the Spanish Civil War

See also
 First Battle of Tembien and Second Battle of Tembien, fought between Italian and Ethiopian forces in 1936
 Dogu'a Tembien (Upper Tembien), a district of Ethiopia
 Kola Tembien (Lower Tembien), a district of Ethiopia